Hussain Assem Al-Hizam (born 4 January 1998 in Jubail) is a Saudi Arabian athlete specialising in the pole vault. He won the gold medal at the 2017 Islamic Solidarity Games.

His personal bests in the event are 5.70 metres outdoors (Austin 2021) and 5.70 metres indoors ( 2018). Both are current national records.

His father, Asim Al-Hizam, is a former decathlete and a current athletics coach.

Competition record

1No mark in the final

References

1998 births
Living people
Saudi Arabian male athletes
People from Eastern Province, Saudi Arabia
Athletes (track and field) at the 2014 Asian Games
Athletes (track and field) at the 2018 Asian Games
Athletes (track and field) at the 2014 Summer Youth Olympics
Kansas Jayhawks men's track and field athletes
Asian Games competitors for Saudi Arabia
Islamic Solidarity Games competitors for Saudi Arabia
Islamic Solidarity Games medalists in athletics
21st-century Saudi Arabian people